Jason Ebanks (born 19 December 1988) is a Caymanian footballer who plays as a midfielder. He has represented the Cayman Islands during a World Cup qualifying match in 2008. His older brother Jedd Ebanks also plays for the same club. He recently became a father.

References

Association football midfielders
Living people
1988 births
Caymanian footballers
Cayman Islands international footballers
Elite SC players
Cayman Islands under-20 international footballers